The 1992 UCI Mountain Bike World Championships were held in Bromont, Quebec, Canada from 16 to 17 September 1992.

Medal summary

Men's events

Women's events

Medal table

References

External links

UCI Mountain Bike World Championships
International cycle races hosted by Canada
UCI Mountain Bike World Championships
Mountain biking events in Canada